Break Free (simplified Chinese: 曙光) is a Malaysian television drama series. It stars Tay Ping Hui, Terence Cao, Zhang Zhen Huan, Andie Chen, Yvonne Lim and Kate Pang as the main characters in the story. The story revolves around four men from different backgrounds who were convicted to jail and their aftermaths when they were released.

It was broadcast on MediaCorp Channel 8 in Singapore from 18 March 2013 to 26 April 2013, and on ntv7 in Malaysia from 27 March 2013 to 16 May 2013. A total of 30 episodes were aired during this period.

Episodes

See also
Break Free
List of MediaCorp Channel 8 Chinese Drama Series (2010s)

References

Lists of Singaporean television series episodes
Lists of Malaysian television series episodes
Lists of soap opera episodes